Danny Chan Kwok-kwan (born 1 August 1975) is a Hong Kong actor, martial artist, dance choreographer, and lead singer of the rock band Poet. He is known for resembling Bruce Lee in appearance and has portrayed Lee in the 2008 television series The Legend of Bruce Lee, the 2015 film Ip Man 3, and its 2019 sequel, Ip Man 4. Chan is also a practitioner of Jeet Kune Do, the martial art created by Bruce Lee.

Career
Chan started his career as the lead singer of the rock band Poet. He also played minor roles in several Hong Kong films.

He first came to prominence for acting in two films directed by Stephen Chow—as the goalkeeper "Empty Hand" in Shaolin Soccer (2001), and as the Axe Gang boss Brother Sum in Kung Fu Hustle (2004). In 2008, due to his resemblance to Bruce Lee, he was chosen to portray the famous martial artist in the biographical television series The Legend of Bruce Lee.

Chan reprised his role as Lee in the 2015 film Ip Man 3, which is loosely based on the life of Lee's mentor. He took on the role once more in the 2019 film Ip Man 4, the final installment in the franchise.

Personal life
Chan has been married to Hong Kong actress Emme Wong since 2014. Chan has sparked controversy for his pro-Beijing stance, after he expressed support for the Hong Kong Police Force during the 2019 Hong Kong Protests. He had posted on social media that police should not "go easy on any [protesters]" nor "let any one of them go".

Filmography

Film

Television

References

External links
 LoveHKfilm entry
 Living up to Bruce Lee's Legend
 
 
 Hong Kong Cinemagic: Danny Chan Kwok-kwan
 Danny Chan Kwok-kwan 陳國坤 - spcnet.tv

1975 births
Living people
Hong Kong male film actors
Hong Kong martial artists
Chinese Jeet Kune Do practitioners
Cantonese people
Hong Kong male television actors
20th-century Hong Kong male actors
21st-century Hong Kong male actors